Evelyn M. Nowak (May 18, 1913September 30, 2013) was an American politician, who served as a member of the Michigan House of Representatives from the Wayne County, Michigan 1st district.

Early life
Nowak was born in Detroit, Michigan on May 18, 1913 to John W. and Emma Marshick. Nowak graduated from Western High School in Detroit.

Career
On November 7, 1944, Nowak was elected to as a member of the Michigan House of Representatives where represented the Wayne County 1st distinct. Nowak was sworn in on January 3, 1945. In 1946, Nowak was not re-elected. Nowak was a Democrat.

Personal life
Nowak married Francis J. Nowak, who would also be elected to the Michigan Legislature on July 1, 1939. Together, they had one child.

Death
Nowak died on September 30, 2013.

References

1913 births
2013 deaths
American centenarians
Politicians from Detroit
Women state legislators in Michigan
Democratic Party members of the Michigan House of Representatives
21st-century American women
20th-century American women politicians
20th-century American politicians
Women centenarians